John Cashmore (June 7, 1895 – May 7, 1961) was an American politician from New York City who served as Borough President of Brooklyn from 1940 until his death in 1961.

Career

Business 
Cashmore was an aide to the general manager of the New York Edison Company and a furniture manufacturer.

Politics 
Cashmore was a member of the New York State Assembly (Kings Co., 5th D.) in 1923. He was a member of the New York State Democratic Committee from 1938 to 1944. He was the Democratic candidate for U.S. Senator from New York in 1952, but was defeated by the incumbent Republican Irving M. Ives. He was a delegate to the 1948, 1952, 1956 and 1960 Democratic National Conventions.

Personal life 
Cashmore married Edythe Tenney (1898–1972). They had one son, James John Cashmore (1931–1977).

In popular culture 
The 1974 Harry Chapin song "Cat's in the Cradle" was based in part on John Cashmore's relationship with his son James, to whom Chapin's wife had been previously married.

Sources 
 Political Graveyard
 Behind The Song: Cat's In The Cradle

External links 
 

1895 births
1961 deaths
Brooklyn borough presidents
Democratic Party members of the New York State Assembly
20th-century American politicians